Demba Kunda  is a small town in south-eastern Gambia. It is located in Fulladu East District in the Upper River Division.  As of 2009, it has an estimated population of 5283.

Gambissara Forest Park is located nearby.

References

Populated places in the Gambia
Upper River Division